Ribe-Esbjerg HH is a handball club based in the town of Ribe in Jutland, Denmark. The club was founded on 1 May 1973 and was the result of a merger between Ribe Håndboldklub and Sædding Idrætsforening. Ribe-Esbjerg HH competes in the men's Danish Handball League.

Team

Staff
Staff for the 2021–22 season

Current squad
Squad for the 2022–23 season

Goalkeeper
 12  Ronnie Nicolaisen
 16  Ágúst Elí Björgvinsson
 74  Markus Howe Madsen
Wingers
LW
 31  Morten Jørgensen
 92  Sune Iversen
RW
 11  Mathias Jørgensen (c)
 93  Arnar Birkir Hálfdansson
Pivots
 2  Sander Juel
 15  Jesper Munk
 17  Andreas Søgaard

Back players
LB
 4  Elvar Ásgeirsson
 10  Magnus Haubro Jensen
 19  Jesper Lindgren
 23  William Aar
CB
 7  Jonas Larholm
 18  Marcus Mørk
RB
 5  Emil Grønbech Hansen 
 8  Simon Birkefeldt
 14  Marcus Dahlin

Transfers
Transfers for the 2022–23 season

Joining
  Ágúst Elí Björgvinsson (GK) (from  KIF Kolding)
  Ronnie Nicolaisen (GK) (from  TTH Holstebro)
  Magnus Haubro Jensen (LB) (from  Skive fH)
  Elvar Ásgeirsson (LB) (from  Grand Nancy Métropole Handball)
  Marcus Dahlin (RB) (from  SønderjyskE Håndbold)
  Arnar Birkir Hálfdansson (RW) (from  EHV Aue)
  Jesper Munk (P) (from  TTH Holstebro)
  Andreas Søgaard (P) (from  Skive fH)

Leaving
  Søren Rasmussen (Retires) (Goalkepping Coach to  TTH Holstebro)
  Andreas Haagen (GK) (to  Ajax København)
  Jonas Hald Christensen (LW) (to  Ajax København)
  Torben Petersen (LB)  (to  Skanderborg Aarhus Håndbold)
  Anton Fredslund Pedersen (LB)  (to  Faaborg ØH)
  Jonathan Mollerup (RB) (to  Skanderborg Aarhus Håndbold)
  Tobias Olsen (RB/RW) (to  Ajax København)
  Miha Zvizej (P) (to  TTH Holstebro)
  Christoffer Langerhuus (P) (to  Bækkelagets SK)

Transfers for the 2022–23 season

Joining
  Axel Franzén (P) (from  Mors-Thy Håndbold)

Leaving
  Jesper Munk (P)

References

Danish handball clubs
Handball clubs established in 2008
2008 establishments in Denmark